The John B. Kelly House, at 422 South 200 West in Salt Lake City, Utah, was built in 1865. It was listed on the National Register of Historic Places in 1983.

Description
It was the home of John B. Kelly who had an early book binding and printing firm. It is one of only two known examples of its architectural type in Utah;  the other, the Alma Staker House in Mount Pleasant, Utah is also NRHP-listed.  It is a "temple-form" Greek Revival home that follows a pattern promoted by Minard Lafever.  Although it is of modest size, the symmetric front design, with two story center and side wings, is imitative of monumental ancient Greek forms.

See also

 National Register of Historic Places listings in Salt Lake City

References

Houses on the National Register of Historic Places in Utah
Greek Revival houses in Utah
Houses completed in 1865
Houses in Salt Lake City
National Register of Historic Places in Salt Lake City